(June 24, 1661 – December 16, 1730) was a Japanese daimyō of the Edo period, who ruled the Tokushima Domain. His court title was Awaji no kami.

Family
 Father: Hachisuka Takanori (1642-1695)
 Mother: Oshichi no Kata
 Wives:
 Enhime
 Kahime
 Concubines:
 Yokoyama-dono
 Fukura-dono
 Commoner
 Children:
 Hachisuka Yoshitake (1692-1725) by Enhime
 Hachisuka Munekazu by Kahime
 Kotaro by Yokoyama-dono
 Hachisuka Takahiro (1694-1756) by Yokoyama-dono
 Ishimaru by Yokoyama-dono
 daughter by Fukura-dono
 Donosuke by Commoner
 Renkoin married Ii Naonobu by Commoner
 Hachigoro by Commoner
 Gengo by Commoner
 daughter married Ogasawara Tadasada by Commoner
 daughter married Okubo Tadaoki by Commoner
 daughter married Ando Nobutada by Commoner

References

1661 births
1730 deaths
Daimyo
Hachisuka clan